Seyyedan Rural District is in Abish Ahmad District of Kaleybar County, East Azerbaijan province, Iran. At the National Census of 2006, its population was 4,336 in 926 households. There were 3,032 inhabitants in 841 households at the following census of 2011. At the most recent census of 2016, the population of the rural district was 2,649 in 840 households. The largest of its 19 villages was Oti Kandi, with 791 people.

References 

Kaleybar County

Rural Districts of East Azerbaijan Province

Populated places in East Azerbaijan Province

Populated places in Kaleybar County